Rodney Amateau (December 20, 1923 – June 29, 2003) was an American film and television screenwriter, director, and producer.

Career

Among the programs that he directed were The Dennis Day Show, The George Burns and Gracie Allen Show, The Many Loves of Dobie Gillis, Mister Ed, Gilligan's Island, The Bob Cummings Show and The New Phil Silvers Show. He produced My Mother the Car and Supertrain, and wrote the story for the 1988 film Sunset. Amateau also directed a few episodes of The Dukes of Hazzard, and appeared in a handful of episodes as an actor as well.

In 1987, he directed, produced and co-wrote The Garbage Pail Kids Movie, which is considered to be one of the worst films ever made.

Personal life
From 1945 to 1949, he was married to actress Coleen Gray, who sued him for child support in 1955. Amateau was then married to actress and screenwriter Joane Andre from 1950 to 1959. Together, they had one daughter. From 1959 to 1962, he was married to Sandra Burns, daughter of George Burns and Gracie Allen.

Retirement and death
Amateau retired from directing in 1989. He died from a cerebral hemorrhage in 2003 in Los Angeles, aged 79.

Filmography

Film

TV

References

External links
 

1923 births
2003 deaths
American male screenwriters
Film producers from New York (state)
American television directors
Television producers from New York City
American television writers
Film directors from New York City
American male television writers
Screenwriters from New York (state)
20th-century American male writers
20th-century American screenwriters